Su Hart (born 3 September 1959) is a British musician,  living in Bath, UK, and vocalist of the band Baka Beyond which was formed in 1992, when she and her partner, guitar, mandolin and bouzouki player Martin Cradick (formerly of the group Outback) travelled to south-east Cameroon to live with the Baka tribe (hunter-gatherer Pygmies) in the rainforest and record their music. The band was inspired by the Baka, "one of the oldest and most sensitive musical cultures on earth".

The Baka
The encounter with the Baka was to set their lives in a new direction. "It was the amazing bird-like singing or yelli that first attracted me, ... The women get together before the dawn to sing, enchant the animals of the forest and ensure that the men's hunting will be successful. Song and dance are used by the Baka for healing, for rituals, for keeping the community together and also for pure fun"

She frequently travels to other countries to pick up musical influences.

Su Hart founded the Walcot State Choir in Bath in 2000 and has directed it since. As well as meeting regularly every Tuesday in term time, the choir has collaborated in cultural exchanges with the Ensemble Vocal Maitres Et Maitresses of Auch, France, and choirs in Kaposvar which is twinned with Bath, and the Brunnenpassage Choir in Vienna.

In 2013, she helped to run the Shakti Sings Choir at the Glastonbury Festival, writing songs to raise ecological awareness.

References

External links
Baka Beyond
1heart Charity
Su Hart's website

English buskers
Living people
1959 births
People from Gateshead
Musicians from Tyne and Wear
English folk musicians
British world music musicians